Drumclog is a hamlet in Scotland.

Drumclog may also refer to:

 Drumclog Moss, bog
 Battle of Drumclog, battle fought at the Drumclog bog
 Drumclog railway station, in South Lanarkshire, Scotland